Elections to the Provincial Assembly of Balochistan were held in 1988.

Results

Further reading

References

Elections in Balochistan
1988 elections in Pakistan